Shunji Takano (高野 俊二 Takano Shunji) (born February 16, 1964) is a Japanese retired professional wrestler.

Early life
Takano was born on February 16, 1964. His father was a black American Marine who belonged to the Iwakuni base, and has also become a promising boxer. However, his father returned to the United States and left his wife, a Japanese woman, and children in Japan. Takano grew up at home with his mother and brother, and he was a mixed-blooded child.

Career

New Japan Pro-Wrestling (1981–1982, 1984-1985)
Shunji Takano debuted for New Japan Pro-Wrestling on December 8, 1981, defeating Fumihiro Niikura. In his early years, he stayed within the undercard and the lower mid-card area, wrestling the likes of Niikura, Shinichi Nakano, Shunji Kosugi, Norio Honaga, Nobuhiko Takada, Masanobu Kurisu, and Junji Hirata.  Upon his return to NJPW in October 1984, Takano began moving up the card slowly, but his unhappiness with the company caused him to leave NJPW in September 1985.

North America (1983-1987)
In 1983, Takano went on an excursion to Canada, wrestling for Stu Hart's Stampede Wrestling in Calgary. While there, he formed a tag team with Hiro Saito called the Calgary Hurricanes, which would later become a trio with Junji Hirata, who by then became known as the masked Super Strong Machine.

In October 1986, Takano went on an excursion to the United States. His first stop was for Verne Gagne's American Wrestling Association in Minneapolis, through Masa Saito's connections, where he wrestled under a mask and went by the name, the Super Ninja. Upon his debut, he was aligned with Larry Zbyszko. In January 1987, Takano had his first major title match against Nick Bockwinkel for the AWA World Heavyweight Championship, in which he lost by disqualification. In May 1987, he moved to Portland to wrestle for Don Owen's Pacific Northwest Wrestling, still wrestling under the Super Ninja persona. In July 1987, Takano won his first championship, the NWA Pacific Northwest Tag Team Championship with Rip Oliver, with whom he held the titles for nearly two months, before Oliver left the territory, and was replaced by Joey Jackson, who Takano held the titles for nearly two months with, before finally losing them to The Southern Rockers (Steve Doll and Scott Peterson).

All Japan Pro Wrestling (1985–1987, 1988-1990)
After a brief return to Calgary, Shunji Takano went to All Japan Pro Wrestling in November 1985, originally as part of Riki Choshu's Japan Pro-Wrestling group. 

Takano returned to AJPW in February 1988 toruing in North America, and by that time, his stock was beginning to rise. That summer, Takano began teaming up with Shinichi Nakano. On September 9, 1988, Takano and Nakano defeated Footloose (Samson Fuyuki and Toshiaki Kawada) to win the All Asia Tag Team Championship, ending their reign after exactly six months, although Footloose would win back the titles six days later. In the tail end of 1988, he teamed with John Tenta for the World's Strongest Tag Determination League, but ended up placing ninth place with four points. A year later, he tried again, this time with The Great Kabuki as his partner, but he ended up dead last with two points, in a tie with The Nasty Boys (Brian Knobbs and Jerry Sags).

Super World of Sports (1990–1992)
After leaving AJPW in the summer of 1990, Shunji Takano joined Super World of Sports, in which he joined the stable, Palestra, led by his older brother, George. On SWS's pre-launch show on September 29, 1990, a one-night singles tournament took place, in which Shunji defeated Fumihiro Niikura and Kendo Nagasaki, before losing to his older brother George in the semi-finals. When SWS officially launched the promotion on October 18, 1990, Shunji teamed with his brother George for the one-night tag team tournament, in which they defeated Isao Takagi and Yoshiaki Yatsu in the semi-finals and Genichiro Tenryu and The Great Kabuki in the finals. On November 22, 1990, he took part in another one-night tag team tournament, this time with Naoki Sano as his partner. They defeated Takashi Ishikawa and The Great Kabuki in the semi-finals, but lost to Genichiro Tenryu and Koji Kitao in the finals. On August 9, 1991, he teamed up with his older brother for another one-night tag team tournament. They defeated The Great Kabuki and Tito Santana in the first round, but lost to The Legion Of Doom in the semi-finals. On April 16, 1992, he and his older brother won the SWS Tag Team Championship, defeating King Haku and Yoshiaki Yatsu. Unfortunately, their reign didn't last long, as they lost the titles to The Natural Disasters the next day.

Freelance and retirement (1992–1996, 1997-1998)
After SWS folded in June 1992, Shunji Takano joined his brother George in forming a new promotion called Pro Wrestling Crusaders. Also, Takano worked for Network Of Wrestling. Their trainees had included Masato Tanaka and Tetsuhiro Kuroda, who both transferred to Frontier Martial-Arts Wrestling. Aside from running PWC, he would also wrestle for other promotions including Network Of Wrestling, Social Progress Wrestling Federation, Wrestling International New Generations, International Wrestling Association of Japan, and Michinoku Pro Wrestling. PWC folded in 1994.

His last match as a wrestler was held on December 26, 1996, as Gulliver X, teaming with Gulliver XX, losing to The Great Sasuke and Yuki Ishikawa. He quietly retired shortly thereafter but returned in August 1997. Takano retired for good at the end of 1998.

Championships and accomplishments
All Japan Pro Wrestling
All Asia Tag Team Championship (1 time) – with Shinichi Nakano
 World's Strongest Tag Determination League Fine Play Award (1988) – with John Tenta
Pacific Northwest Wrestling
NWA Pacific Northwest Tag Team Championship (2 times) – with Rip Oliver (1) and Joey Jackson (1)
Super World of Sports
SWS Tag Team Championship (1 time) – with George Takano

References

External links
Shunji Takano's Cagematch Profile
Shunji Takano's Wrestlingdata Profile

1964 births
Japanese male professional wrestlers
Living people
Masked wrestlers
Sportspeople from Fukuoka (city)
Stampede Wrestling alumni
Japanese people of African-American descent